In the murder case of Niklas P., a 17-year-old boy from Bad Breisig, Rhineland-Palatinate, Germany, was knocked unconscious and then beaten to death by a group of young men while lying on the ground. The crime happened in Bonn, Germany, on the night of 6 to 7 May 2016. Niklas P. later died in hospital. On 18 May, Walid S., a 20-year-old man, was arrested on suspicion of being the main perpetrator. Two accomplices are still being sought by the police. The case received extensive media attention in Germany. Bonn police received 400,000 entries on their Facebook page.

Incidents
On the night of 6 to 7 May, on their way home from a concert Niklas P., his sister and two female friends encountered a group of young men, including Walid S., and was provoked by them verbally. According to the chief prosecutor, Niklas P. wanted to avoid violence and resolve the situation amicably. One of the female friends of Niklas was reportedly slapped and was later molested. Subsequently, Niklas P. was struck violently on the head. After he had fallen down, the perpetrator Walid S. kicked his head with great force.

Bonn police began an intense manhunt and also handed out flyers in the German, Arabic and Turkish languages. There were also two demonstrations, one of 50 far-right protesters and a counter-demonstration of several hundred people.

Suspects
The suspect Walid S. was born in Italy, but has "an additional migration background". Reportedly, he is of Moroccan origin. He was arrested in Mehlem, a district of Bonn, on charges of manslaughter. He is known to the police for other "violent offences". Two further men were arrested with Walid S., but freed later, as the suspicion against them could not be substantiated. However, an alibi given by Walid S. was later proven wrong. Walid S. denied the accusations. The two accomplices are still sought by the police.

On 20 June, it was reported that a new piece of evidence, a jacket stained with blood of Niklas P., was found in the residence of Walid S., who still denied the accusations saying the jacket did not belong to him. There were allegations against the chief prosecutor of concealing the evidence for several days.

See also
 Immigration and crime in Germany

References 

2016 murders in Germany
Deaths by beating in Europe
History of Bonn
May 2016 crimes in Europe
May 2016 events in Germany
Murder in North Rhine-Westphalia
Murdered German children
21st century in Bonn